Joseph Filippi (born 3 November 1953 in Ayrshire), is a Scottish retired football defender.

Filippi began his career with hometown club Ayr United, staying with the Honest Men for eight years. He had a yearlong spell at Celtic, before joining Glasgow neighbours Clyde. He dropped out of the senior game in 1981.

External links

Living people
1953 births
Ayr United F.C. players
Clyde F.C. players
Celtic F.C. players
Scottish footballers
Scottish Football League players
Coventry City F.C. players
Glenafton Athletic F.C. players
Footballers from Irvine, North Ayrshire
Association football fullbacks
Scottish Junior Football Association players